This is a table of medications that are secreted in the kidney.

Acid medication are, because of pH partition, secreted to a higher extent when urine is basic. In the same way, basic medications are secreted to a higher extent when urine is acidic.

References

Pharmacokinetics